M. N. Lakshmi Devi is a veteran film artist in Kannada films. She is from Chintamani and has had a career of 7 decades. She has acted in more than 700 films. Devi is known for the movies "Bhakta Kanakadasa"(1960), "Bangaarada Manushya"(1972), "Veera Kesari"(1963) and many more.

The song "Yaru yaru nee yaru.." from the movie Rathna Manjari(1962), was picturised on Lakshmi Devi and Narasimharaju. Devi has acted many serials and still she is acting in films (Googly-2013), (Rajahuli-2013).

Awards
 2001-02 - Karnataka State Film Award for Best Supporting Actress - Kallara Kalla.
 2006-07 - Dr. Rajkumar Lifetime Achievement Award by Karnataka Government.

Select filmography

 2018 Tagaru
 2017 Tiger Galli
 2016 John jani Janardhan
 2015 Prema Pallakki 
 2013 Raja Huli
 2015 Male Nilluvavarege
 2015 Mahakali
 2015 Goolihatti
 2015 Vamshoddharaka
 2015 Prema Pallakki
 2015 Master Piece
 2014 Gandhiji Kanasu
 2014 Pandya
 2014 Jaggi
 2013 Veera
 2013 Gajendra
 2013 Auto Raja
 2013 Googly
 2013 Nanda Gokula
 2013 Bhajarangi
 2012 Munjane
 2011 Veerabahu
 2011 Dudde Doddappa
 2011 Bhadra
 2011 Hero Nanalla
 2011 College College
 2010 Nan Madid Thappa
 2010 Preethiya Theru
 2010 Dildaara
 2010 Swayamvara
 2010 Olave Vismaya
 2010 Narada Vijaya
 2010 Huduga Hudugi
 2009 Ee Sambhashane
 2009 Jaaji Mallige
 2009 Savaari
 2009 Maccha
 2009 Dubai Babu
 2009 Bhagyada Balegaara
 2009 Devaru Kotta Thangi
 2008 Navashakthi Vaibhava
 2008 Inthi Ninna Preethiya
 2008 Jnana Jyothi Sri Siddaganga
 2008 Chellatada Hudugaru
 2008 Bandhu Balaga
 2008 Madesha
 2008 Sangaathi
 2008 Akka Thangi
 2008 Rocky
 2008 Gulama
 2007 Thamashegagi
 2007 Nali Naliyutha
 2006 Mata
 2006 Hatavadi
 2006 Thandege Thakka Maga
 2006 Thangigagi
 2006 Savira Mettilu
 2006 Hubli
 2006 Nage Habba
 2006 Neelakanta
 2005 Varsha
 2005 Mr. Bakra
 2005 Sye
 2005 Hudgeer Saar Hudgeeru
 2005 Namma Basava
 2005 Vishnu Sena
 2004 Abbabba Entha Huduga
 2004 Ranga (SSLC)
 2004 Kanasina Loka
 2004 Rama Krishna
 2004 Kalasipalya
 2004 Jyeshta
 2003 Manasella Neene
 2003 Sacchi
 2003 Kutumba
 2003 Thayi Illada Thabbali
 2003 Nanjundi
 2003 Ondagona Baa
 2003 Partha
 2003 Annavru
 2002 Law and Order
 2002 Olu Saar Baree Olu
 2001 Grama Devathe
 2001 Huccha
 2001 Jipuna Nanna Ganda
 2001 Kanoonu
 2001 Sundara Kanda
 2000 Indra Dhanush
 2000 Naga Devathe
 2000 Nan Hendthi Chennagiddale
 2000 Soorappa, 
 2000 Sulthan, 
 2000 Yajamana, 
 1999 Durga Shakthi
 1999 Patela
 1999 Premachari
 1999 Rambhe Urvashi Menake
 1999 Ravimama
 1999 Sambhrama
 1999 The Killer
 1998 Arjun Abhimanyu
 1998 Jagath Kiladi
 1998 Mathina Malla
 1998 Marthanda
 1998 Simhada Guri
 1997 Anna Andre Nammanna
 1997 Honey Moon
 1997 Maduve
 1997 O Mallige
 1997 Ranganna
 1997 Thavarina Theru
 1996 Annavra Makkalu
 1996 Boss
 1995 Gadibidi Aliya
 1995 Hendathi Endare Heegirabeku
 1995 Kalyanothsava
 1995 Operation Antha
 1995 State Rowdy
 1995 Thaliya Sowbhagya
 1995 Yama Kinkara
 1994 Beda Krishna Ranginata
 1994 Hettha Karulu
 1994 Mutthanna
 1994 Rayara Maga
 1993 Muddina Maava
 1991 Gowri Kalyana
 1991 Krama
 1990 Chapala Chennigaraya
 1989 Ananthana Avanthara
 1987 Yarigagi
 1985 Balondu Uyyale
 1985 Kumkuma Thanda Sowbhagya
 1985 Shabhash Vikram
 1985 Thayi Thande
 1984 Police Papanna
 1983 Gedda Maga
 1983 Mutthaide Bhagya
 1982 Kalasapurada Hudugaru
 1981 Kula Puthra
 1980 Makkala Sainya
 1978 Kiladi Kittu
 1978 Maathu Tappada Maga
 1978 Madhura Sangama
 1977 Banashankari
 1977 Bhagyavantharu
 1977 Chinna Ninna Muddaduve
 1977 Nagara Hole
 1977 Pavana Ganga
 1977 Sanaadi Appanna
 1977 Manassinanthe Mangalya
 1977 Shubhashaya
 1976 Kanasu Nanasu
 1976 Makkala Bhagya
 1976 Vijaya Vani
 1976 Hudugatada Hudugi
 1975 Devara Kannu
 1975 Mane Belaku
 1975 Thrimurthy
 1974 Anna Attige
 1974 Bhakta Kumbara(Tulasi)
 1974 Maga Mommaga
 1974 Upasane
 1973 Bangarada Kalla
 1973 Devaru Kotta Thangi
 1972 Bangaarada Manushya
 1972 Naa Mechida Huduga
 1972 Naagarahaavu(Mary)
 1972 Nanda Gokula
 1972 Triveni
 1972 Jeevana Jokali
 1971 Anugraha
 1971 Baala Bandhana (Papakshi)
 1971 Bhale Adrushtavo Adrushta
 1971 Kulagaurava
 1971 Sharapanjara (Maithili)
 1970 Gejje Pooje (Savithri)
 1970 Lakshmi Saraswathi
 1970  Modala Rathri
 1969 Broker Bheeshmachari
 1969 Chikkamma
 1969 Shiva Bhakta  (Gopi)
 1968  Bhagya Devathe
 1968 Sarvamangala
 1967 Immadi Pulikeshi
 1967 Padavidhara
 1965 Bereta Jeeva
 1965 Mahasati Anasuya
 1965 Pathala Mohini
 1963 Gowri
 1963 Jenu Goodu
 1963 Nanda Deepa
 1963 Saaku Magalu
 1963 Valmiki
 1963 Veera Kesari
 1962 Gaali Gopura
 1962 Mahatma Kabir (Alaka)
 1962 RathnaManjari
 1962 Swarna Gowri
 1962 Thejaswini
 1962 Vidhi Vilasa
 1961 Vijayanagarada Veeraputra
 1960 Rani Honnamma
 1960 Makkala Rajya
 1960 Aasha Sundari
 1960 Bhakta Kanakadasa
 1958 Anna Thangi
 1957 Chintamani
 1957 Rathnagiri Rahasya
 1957 Rayara Sose
 1956 Daiva Sankalpa
 1955 Sodari (Geeta)
 1953 Sowbhagya Lakshmi (singari)

See also

List of people from Karnataka
Cinema of Karnataka
List of Indian film actors
Cinema of India

References

Indian film actresses
Living people
Actresses in Kannada cinema
Place of birth missing (living people)
People from Mandya
20th-century Indian actresses
21st-century Indian actresses
Actresses from Karnataka
1934 births